Yeovil District Hospital is a healthcare facility in Yeovil, Somerset, England. It is managed by Yeovil District Hospital NHS Foundation Trust.

History
The hospital has its origins in a general dispensary established at the suggestion of Dr Elias Taylor Warry in a cottage in Kingston in March 1858. This was replaced by a purpose-built facility at Batt's Corner known as Fiveways Hospital in 1872. This was, in turn, replaced by an improved facility in Bide's Gardens which was designed by Paul Waterhouse and officially opened as Yeovil General Hospital by the Prince of Wales on 19 July 1923. It joined the National Health Service in 1948.

The current facility was designed by Sir Percy Thomas & Son and construction started in Higher Kingston in 1968. It was officially opened by Prince Edward, Duke of Kent on 15 October 1973. It was refurbished, creating a new coronary care unit, intensive care unit and private patient ward at a cost of £9.3 million, in 2000. A 24-bed extension was completed in April 2016.

References

External links

NHS hospitals in England
Hospitals in Somerset
Buildings and structures in Yeovil
South Somerset